South Street Hindu Nadar Higher Secondary School (SSHN Higher Secondary School) is a private school located in the village of Muhavoor, at Rajapalayam Taluk, Virudhunagar District, Tamil Nadu State .

References

High schools and secondary schools in Tamil Nadu
Education in Virudhunagar district